William Kelly's War is a 2014 Australian film, set during World War I. It was directed by Geoff Davis, and written by his sons Josh and Matthew.

Cast
 Tony Bonner as Mr Kelly, the patriarch of the family. He is killed by bushrangers while Billy is fighting in Europe.
 Josh Davis as William "Billy" Kelly, an Australian soldier in Gallipoli and France during World War I
 Matthew John Davis as Jack Kelly, the brother of Billy
 Ella McIlvena as Jess Kelly, the sister of Billy
 Helen Davis as Marjorie Kelly, the matriarch of the family
 Lachlan Hume as Paddy, the cousin of the Kelly siblings
 Maureen Alford

Production
The battle and trench scenes were shot on the Davis family farm in Victoria, with fortifications being made from chipboard, mud and cement.

Release
The film was originally titled The Stolen when it premiered in Cannes in May 2014, and was released in theatres across rural Victoria on 30 October that year.

References

External links
 

2014 films
Australian war drama films
Australian World War I films
World War I films based on actual events
2014 war drama films
2014 drama films
2010s English-language films
2010s Australian films